Shihezi Huayuan Airport  is an airport serving the city of Shihezi in Xinjiang Uygur Autonomous Region, China. It was moved and rebuilt at a new location 15 kilometers southwest of the city center. Construction began on May 24, 2012, after the project received final approval in April 2012. The airport was budgeted to cost 515 million yuan to rebuild. It reopened on 26 December 2015.

Facilities
Shihezi Airport has a runway that is 2,400 meters long and 45 meters wide (class 4C), a 3,000 square-meter terminal building, three parking aprons for commercial aircraft, and 40 parking spaces for general aviation aircraft. It is designed to handle 180,000 passengers and 270 tons of cargo per year by 2020.

Airlines and destinations

See also
List of airports in China
List of the busiest airports in China

References

Airports in Xinjiang
Airports established in 2015
2015 establishments in China